Cyanothamnus fabianoides is a plant in the citrus family, Rutaceae and is endemic to the south-west of Western Australia. It is a compact shrub with many branches, simple, more or less cylindrical leaves and single white, pink or pale blue four-petalled flowers in the leaf axils.

Description
The eight stamens are hairy.

Taxonomy and naming
This boronia was first formally described in 1904 by Ludwig Diels who gave it the name Eriostemon fabianoides and published the description in Botanische Jahrbücher für Systematik, Pflanzengeschichte und Pflanzengeographie. The specific epithet (fabianoides) means "similar to a species of Fabiana". In a 2013 paper in the journal Taxon, Marco Duretto and others changed the name to Cyanothamnus fabianoides on the basis of cladistic analysis.

In 1998 Paul G. Wilson had described two subspecies. The names have subsequently been changed to reflect the change in the genus name:

Distribution and habitat
Subspecies fabianoides grows in eucalypt woodland between Norseman and the Esperance area but subspecies rosea grows on hillslopes, around granite rocks and undulating plains between Lake King and the Fraser Range east of Norseman.

Conservation
Both subspecies of C. fabianoides are classified as "not threatened" by the Western Australian Government Department of Parks and Wildlife.

References

fabianoides
Flora of Western Australia
Plants described in 1904
Taxa named by Ludwig Diels